Shantipur is a census town in Sahid Matangini CD block in Tamluk subdivision of Purba Medinipur district in the state of West Bengal, India.

Geography

Location

Urbanisation
94.08% of the population of Tamluk subdivision live in the rural areas. Only 5.92% of the population live in the urban areas, and that is the second lowest proportion of urban population amongst the four subdivisions in Purba Medinipur district, just above Egra subdivision.

Note: The map alongside presents some of the notable locations in the subdivision. All places marked in the map are linked in the larger full screen map.

Demographics
As per 2011 Census of India Shantipur had a total population of 9,746 of which 4,979 (51%) were males and 4,767 (49%) were females. Population below 6 years was 1,017. The total number of literates in Shantipur was 7,677 (87.95% of the population over 6 years).

Infrastructure
As per the District Census Handbook 2011, Shantipur covered an area of 2.1332 km2. It had the facility of a railway station at Mecheda nearby and bus routes in the town. Amongst the civic amenities it had 1,500 domestic electric connections. Amongst the medical facilities it had a hospital 1 km away and 23 medicine shops in the town. Amongst the educational facilities it had were 8 primary schools. The nearest secondary school and senior secondary school were at Hakola 1.5 km away. The nearest degree college was 30 km away at Midnapore. Amongst the recreational and cultural facilities a cinema theatre was there in the town.

Transport
Shantipur is on the Haldia-Tamluk-Mecheda Road.

References

Cities and towns in Purba Medinipur district